The Uzbekistan national football team ( / ) represents Uzbekistan in international football and is controlled by the Uzbekistan Football Association, the governing body for football in Uzbekistan.

Uzbekistan holds the highest competitive results among teams from Central Asia. Although they have never qualified to the World Cup, the team has qualified to every AFC Asian Cup since post-independence formation. At the 2011 Asian Cup, Uzbekistan reached the semi-finals of the tournament for the first time. At other competitions such as the Asian Games, Uzbekistan won the gold medal in 1994 in Japan, while finishing as the runners-up at the Afro-Asian Cup of Nations in 1995.

History 

The year of birth of football in Uzbekistan is 1912 (read more in this article), since it was then that football teams were created in Kokand, a little later in Ferghana, Andijan, Tashkent, Samarkand, Bukhara and Urganch, between which began to be held long-distance matches. The first championship of Ferghana valley was held in 1914, the Championship of the Uzbekistan SSR began to be played since 1926, and the drawing of the Uzbekistan SSR Cup began to be carried out since 1939. From 1924 to 1991 Uzbekistan was part of the Soviet Union (USSR) as the Uzbekistan Soviet Socialist Republic (UzSSR).

In 1928, the national team of Uzbekistan was created for the first time, which took part in the Spartakiade, which included representatives of some European countries. At this tournament, the national team of Uzbekistan Soviet Socialist Republic held its first international match against team of jobs Switzerland and won with a score of 8:4. Until mid-1991, Uzbekistan was part of the USSR and had its own national team as well as the rest of the Union republics, which mostly played matches within teams and teams of the USSR, in particular in football tournaments of the Spartakiad of Peoples of the USSR. The national team of the Uzbekistan SSR participated in all draws of the football tournament of the Spartakiad of Peoples of the USSR, and in the 1986 tournament reached the final, lost to the Ukrainian SSR (modern Ukraine) team with a score of 0–1, thereby winning the silver medal of the tournament. Throughout the history of Soviet Union, Uzbekistan SSR was one of five main center of football development in the country, alongside Russia SFSR, Ukraine SSR, Belarus SSR and Georgia SSR.

The most powerful football clubs, as well as semi-professional and professional clubs of the Uzbekistan SSR participated in the USSR Football League (Higher League, First League, Second League and Second League B) and USSR Cup. Nonprofessional clubs of the Uzbekistan SSR participated in the Uzbekistan SSR Championship and the Uzbekistan SSR Cup.

After the dissolution of the Soviet Union, and Uzbekistan gained independence, the national team of Uzbekistan of the new convocation was organized. The national team held its first matches in 1992. The first game of the national team of Uzbekistan was a match against Tajikistan, in the framework of the Central Asian Cup 1992 (the tournament was held once) initiated by FIFA. These matches are officially registered by FIFA on the basis of the fact that the national team of Uzbekistan has been allowed since 1992 to participate in tournaments held under the auspices of FIFA. At the drawing of this tournament in the format of the league, the national team of Uzbekistan was the second after the national team of Kazakhstan. In the first year of existence, the national team of Uzbekistan held matches only with the teams of Tajikistan, Turkmenistan, Kazakhstan and Kyrgyzstan. In 1993, the team has not played a single match.

In 1992, Uzbekistan was also a member of the CIS national football team, which existed for one year and replaced the USSR national football team and instead participated in the Euro 1992.

Most of the former Soviet republics became members of UEFA (Russia, Ukraine, Belarus, Moldova, Latvia, Lithuania, Estonia, Georgia, Armenia and Azerbaijan), and Uzbekistan also wanted to become a member of UEFA. But like the rest of the republics of Central Asia (Kazakhstan, Kyrgyzstan, Tajikistan and Turkmenistan), chose AFC. In 2002, Kazakhstan became a member of UEFA for better development of its football, but Uzbekistan chose to remain in the AFC. Anyway, there are many supporters of Uzbekistan's membership in UEFA. Since they believe that Uzbekistan shows European football, and Soviet Uzbekistan, which was part of the USSR, has long been a member of UEFA.

In 1994, the Uzbekistan Football Federation was officially adopted by the AFC and FIFA. In the same year Uzbekistan won in the international tournament the Cup of Independence of Uzbekistan, and at the end of the year the national team won in the ending the national team of China with the score 4:2, became the winner of football tournament of the Asian Games of 1994 which took place in the Japanese city of Hiroshima.

1994 Asian Games 

The 1994 Asian Games tournament was considered as the shocking successful birth of Uzbekistan, and gives prelude for the rise of Uzbekistan as a serious Asian contender. The tournament would go on remembered as "Miracle of 1994".

Although the tournament was mostly for amateur players at the time (the under-23 competed only since 2002), Uzbekistan however was regarded very low. In addition, the Uzbek perpetration was rigorous, with only 17 players and a budget below $14.000 for the new born Football Federation. Conflict also emerged within as Rustam Akramov was appointed as the first coach of Uzbekistan while the more popular Berador Abduraimov became assistant, which Abduraimov resented greatly. Not just that, many of its players, mostly Russian-ethnic based players, chose to represent Russia or Ukraine, or some to Nigeria, following the fall of USSR. The two major clubs, Pakhtakor and Neftchi, formed majority of their players for Uzbek team, traveling to Japan with little expectation.

Nonetheless, Uzbekistan would mark the tournament with an outstanding performance. Grouped with powerhouse Saudi Arabia, two Southeast Asian sides Thailand and Malaysia, alongside Hong Kong, the Uzbeks shocked Hiroshima with a 4–1 victory over the Saudis. It was followed by 5–0 victory over Malaysia, hard-fought 1–0 win over Hong Kong before sealing its first place in a 5–4 thriller over Thailand. In quarter-finals, Uzbekistan taunted neighbor Turkmenistan 3–0 to advance to semi-finals where they faced South Korea. The Koreans sent up nine players that already participated in the 1994 FIFA World Cup and was expected to steamroll Uzbekistan easily, having beaten hosts Japan thanked for a controversial late penalty. Yet, Japanese fans held this grief, cheered Uzbekistan against South Korea and with Japanese support, Uzbekistan shocked South Korea with a 1–0 victory to advance to the final, its first ever final since becoming independence from the Soviet Union.

In their final game against China, Uzbekistan created its miracle, beating the rising Chinese 4–2 to capture its first, and only, Asian honor two years after its existence. This miraculous conquest gave Uzbekistan a new freshing image, and would boost Uzbekistan's position as a serious contender for future Asian competitions.

1996 AFC Asian Cup 
Uzbekistan overcame its rival and neighbor Tajikistan in an insane comeback. Having been beaten 0–4 away in Dushanbe, Uzbekistan looked like would miss its debut. Yet, Uzbekistan overturned the game at home, destroying Tajikistan 5–0 to win 5–4 on aggregate, thus gave Uzbekistan its first ever debut in the tournament.

In 1996 AFC Asian Cup, Uzbekistan was grouped with Japan, China and Syria. Unlike the Asian Games, the Asian Cup was regarded as tougher because it was for main team squad. Under these conditions, Uzbekistan, which only appeared in the 1994 Asian Games, was regarded very low.

Yet, in their opening game against China, Uzbekistan stunned all predictions. Despite rampant Chinese pressure, Uzbekistan held their nerves and overcame China with two shock late goals to give them a 2–0 win and its first ever points in the tournament. This shock victory of Uzbekistan, however, raised alarms for other opponents, Japan and Syria didn't tolerate Uzbekistan, and destroyed the Uzbeks in the two decisive matches. Because of it, Uzbekistan stood bottom in their group and failed to make it through the first round.

1998 FIFA World Cup qualification 
Uzbekistan put a decent performance in the country's first-ever attempt to qualify for World Cup, at the 1998 World Cup qualifiers. Grouped with Yemen, Cambodia and Indonesia in the first stage, Uzbekistan proved to be too strong for the rest, with the team only failed to win once, an away draw to the Indonesians. Shortly after, the Uzbeks gallantly marched into the final stage, however, things would prove to be more difficult, with Uzbekistan did not have luck in facing with more powerful South Korea, Japan and the UAE. The only win for Uzbekistan came after the match against neighbor Kazakhstan. Little to know for many Uzbek supporters, this would begin to make the country as the choker of every major World Cup qualifications, with the team often fell short in their final quest.

2000 AFC Asian Cup 
The 2000 AFC Asian Cup for Uzbekistan was a whitewashed moment, in a terrible way as it became Uzbekistan's worst ever performance in many major competition. Grouped again with Japan, Saudi Arabia and the new opponent Qatar, Uzbekistan was dumped in the bottom once more, with two devastating losses to Saudi Arabia and Japan, alongside its 1–1 draw to Qatar.

2002 FIFA World Cup qualification 
Uzbekistan participated in the first round in order to qualify for the 2002 FIFA World Cup in Japan and South Korea. As thing stood, Uzbekistan were able to dominate the group stage and qualify for the second round. The group contained themselves with China, the UAE, Oman and Qatar. The Uzbeks were unable to make any major breakthrough in the second round, losing twice to the Emirates, two away defeats toward China and Oman and an away draw to Qatar confirmed Uzbekistan's failure to qualify, despite a late win over already qualified China in the final match.

2004 AFC Asian Cup 
Uzbekistan failed to make further impact on the continental stage until they reached the last eight of the 2004 Asian Cup, topping their group after winning all matches, where they were beaten by Bahrain after a penalty shoot-out.

2006 FIFA World Cup qualification 
That performance was followed by a victory over Iraq in the second qualifying round for the 2006 World Cup in Germany, with goals from Maksim Shatskikh and Alexander Geynrikh sending them through to the last eight.

They were knocked out in the final stage of the Asian qualification to the 2006 World Cup after losing on the away goals rule to Bahrain. The result was subject to controversy as actually three games were played; the first, a 1–0 win for Uzbekistan, was wiped out after FIFA declared the result void after a mistake by Toshimitsu Yoshida, a Japanese referee. The replay ended 1–1, and after the return finished 0–0, Uzbekistan were eliminated.

2007 AFC Asian Cup 
In the 2007 Asian Cup, Uzbekistan was able to get past the group stage by beating Malaysia 5–0 and China PR 3–0. However, Uzbekistan was knocked out of the tournament in the quarter-finals by losing to Saudi Arabia 2–1.

2010 FIFA World Cup qualification 

After having three foreign coaches (German Hans-Jürgen Gede, Englishman Bob Houghton and Russian Valeri Nepomniachi) in three years, Uzbekistan turned to former Uzbekistan Olympic team coach Rauf Inileev. During qualification for the 2010 World Cup, Uzbekistan advanced to the fourth round of the Asian qualifiers after winning their first four matches, but finished last in Group A of the final round behind favorites Australia, Japan, Bahrain and Qatar, with four points from eight matches.

2011 AFC Asian Cup 

Four years later, in the 2011 Asian Cup, Uzbekistan ended in fourth place, their best result in the tournament so far. After getting past the group stage and quarter-finals, the Uzbek team lost what it might have been their first Asian Cup final when Australia thrashed the team 0–6 in their semi-final game. Some days later, they were defeated again by South Korea in the third place playoff.

2014 FIFA World Cup qualification 
In qualification for the 2014 World Cup, Uzbekistan advanced to the fourth round of the Asian qualifiers after winning their group in the third round over perennial favorites Japan. Uzbekistan finished with 16 points (five wins and one draw), which was more than any other team in the third round, including an impressive 1–0 away win against Japan.

In the fourth round of the qualifiers, Uzbekistan finished third in Group A behind Iran and South Korea. Uzbekistan had the same number of points as South Korea (14 points), who had a better goal difference by one goal.

The two teams who finished third in the fourth round groups (Jordan and Uzbekistan) played each other in the fifth round to determine the AFC participant in the intercontinental play-off. The games took place on 6 and 10 September 2013. With the two teams still evenly matched at full-time in the second leg, Jordan eventually progressed to the intercontinental play-off after winning 9–8 on penalties.

2015 AFC Asian Cup 
In the 2015 Asian Cup, Uzbekistan advanced to the quarter-finals after finishing as runners-up in the tough Group B, which was won by China, while Saudi Arabia and North Korea were eliminated. However, the team was knocked out of the tournament in the quarter-finals after losing 2–0 in extra time to South Korea.

2018 FIFA World Cup qualification 
Uzbekistan continued their quest to head to the World Cup during 2018 FIFA World Cup qualification in Russia, but their campaign had been shattered with a humiliating 2–4 defeat to North Korea. However, the Uzbeks soon bounced back and won the last remaining matches to top the group and qualified to the 2019 AFC Asian Cup as well as the last round. Once again, Uzbekistan in the last round, missed an opportunity when they finished fourth, behind Iran, South Korea and Syria, when Uzbekistan could only manage a 0–0 draw to the South Koreans last match.

2019 AFC Asian Cup 

Uzbekistan started their 2019 Asian Cup campaign with a 2–1 victory over Oman and continued with a 4–0 win over neighbor Turkmenistan, which guaranteed Uzbekistan to progress from the group stage for the fifth consecutive time, despite ending with a 1–2 defeat to Japan in the last match. However, they had to face Australia, then-champions of Asia. Despite playing well, Uzbekistan could not break the deadlock as it ended 0–0 after 120 minutes. In the penalty shootout, Australia prevailed with a 4–2 win, thus Uzbekistan's dream was crushed in the round of sixteen.

2022 FIFA World Cup qualification 
In the second qualifying round for the 2022 World Cup, Uzbekistan suffered another disappointment by failing to qualify for the final round, a first since the Central Asian team had always reached the final round since it took part in the qualifying rounds of a World Cup, the first time being the 1998 edition. The White Wolves did not manage to finish among the five best runners-up, with a record of 5 wins against 3 defeats (in the first and second leg against Saudi Arabia, leader of group D, as well as in the first leg away against Palestine).

2023 AFC Asian Cup qualification 
Uzbekistan then took part in the third qualifying round for the 2023 Asian Cup. Designated as the host country of Group C (due to the COVID-19 pandemic in Asia), the Central Asians took advantage of this advantage and the relative weakness of most of their opponents to win all three games and finish top of their group without conceding a goal, validating their qualification for the 2023 AFC Asian Cup.

Team image

Nicknames 

The Uzbekistan national team has received several nicknames by supporters and media. The most common one used is "The White Wolves" (  / ).

Also, the Uzbekistan national football team is called "Asian Italy" ( / ). This is due to the similarity of colors (white and blue) clothing teams of Italy and Uzbekistan, as well as similar tactics (defensive football) of these teams. The Uzbekistan Super League is often considered to be similar to Italian Serie A. Also, the history of Uzbekistan is as rich and ancient as the history of Italy.

Also the team of Uzbekistan is called "Huma birds" ( / ). The mythical Huma bird is the national bird of Uzbekistan, and is depicted on the state emblem of Uzbekistan. The Huma bird is depicted on the emblem of the National Olympic Committee of the Republic of Uzbekistan.

Sometimes the Uzbekistan national football is called "Turanians" ( / ), because the current country of Uzbekistan is located in the center of this ancient region Turan, and all the ancient and major cities of this region are located in this country, and therefore Uzbekistan is considered by some to be the successor of the Turan.

Rivalries 

The main rivals of the Uzbekistan national team are the countries of Central Asia, the national teams of Kazakhstan, Tajikistan, Turkmenistan and Kyrgyzstan. However, the main and most important rivals of the national team of Uzbekistan are Kazakhstan and Tajikistan. The matches between the countries of Central Asia have always aroused great interest among fans throughout the region, in spite of Uzbekistan's dominance since the fall of the USSR. Football is one of the instruments of rivalry between the states of Central Asia, dating back to the Soviet era.

Kit sponsorship

Home stadium 

From the moment of its formation (1992) until the end of 2012, the main home stadium of the Uzbekistan national football team was the Pakhtakor Central Stadium in Tashkent, built and opened in 1956. This stadium is also the venue for home matches of Pakhtakor Football Club. During the USSR, this stadium was home for the Uzbekistan SSR national team. Was reconstructed in 1996, 2008 and 2012 and currently holds 35,000 spectators (before this capacity was 55,000 spectators). For today's time the national team of Uzbekistan holds only some of the matches at Pakhtakor Stadium.

From 2013 to the present, the main home stadium of the Uzbekistan national team is the Milliy Stadium (until 2018 was named Bunyodkor Stadium), built in 2008–2012 and accommodating 34,000 spectators. This stadium is also a home for the Bunyodkor Football Club.

Home venues record 

Last updated: 20 November 2022. Statistics include official FIFA-recognised matches only.

Recent results and forthcoming fixtures

The following is a list of match results in the last 12 months, as well as any future matches that have been scheduled.

2022

2023

Coaching staff

Coaching history

Players

Current squad
 The following players were called up for the friendly matches.
 Match dates: 24 and 28 March 2023
 Opposition:  and 
 Caps and goals correct as of: 20 November 2022, after the match against 

 

Recent call-ups
The following players have been called for the last 12 months and are still eligible to represent.

 
 

U23 Included in the U-23 national team.
PRE Preliminary squad standby.
SUS Player suspended.
INJ Player withdrew from the squad due to an injury.
RET Retired from the national team.
WD Player withdrew from the squad for non-injury related reasons.

Player records

Players in bold are still active with Uzbekistan.

Most capped players

Top goalscorers

Competitive record
FIFA World Cup

AFC Asian Cup

Asian Games
Football at the Asian Games has been an under-23 tournament since 2002.

Head-to-head record

As of 20 November 2022 after the match against .

By confederation

FIFA ranking history

 FIFA-ranking yearly averages for Uzbekistan (1994–2022)

Honours
International titlesAfro-Asian Cup of NationsRunner-up (1): 1995

Continental titles
 Asian GamesChampion (1): 1994 
 Asian CupFourth place (1): 2011

Friendly titlesNavruz Cup Champion (1): 2022 Merdeka TournamentChampion (1): 2001 Central Asian CupRunner-up (1): 1992
 China Cup'''
Third place (1): 2019

See also

 Uzbekistan national football team results
 Uzbekistan national under-23 football team
 Uzbekistan national under-20 football team
 Uzbekistan national under-17 football team
 Uzbekistan national futsal team
 Football in Uzbekistan
 Sport in Uzbekistan

References

External links

 Official website  
 FIFA website
 AFC website

 
Asian national association football teams